There have been four baronetcies created for persons with the surname Sutton, one in the Baronetage of Great Britain and three in the Baronetage of the United Kingdom. One creation is extant as of 2021.

He was the second surviving son of the distinguished diplomat Sir Robert Sutton. The latter was the grandson of Henry Sutton, brother of Robert Sutton, 1st Baron Lexinton (see Baron Lexinton for more information on this branch of the family). Hugh Clement Sutton (1867–1928), son of The Hon Henry George Sutton, sixth son of the second Baronet, was a Major-General in the British Army. In the late 19th and early 20th century, the family seat was at Benham Place. However, the house was sold in 1982.

Sutton baronets, of Norwood Park (1772)
Sir Richard Sutton, 1st Baronet (1733–1802)
Sir Richard Sutton, 2nd Baronet (16 December 1798 – 14 November 1855). Sutton succeeded his grandfather in 1802. He was known as a passionate hunter and was Master of the Quorn Hunt, 1847 to 1856. Sutton married Mary Elizabeth Burton (2 November 1797 – 1 January 1842), elder daughter of Benjamin Burton, of Burton Hall, County Carlow, Ireland (a second cousin patrilineally of the 2nd Marquess Conyngham), in 1819. They had seven sons and four daughters.
Sir John Sutton, 3rd Baronet (1820–1873). Sutton married Emma Helena Sherlock (died January 1845), daughter of Colonel Francis Sherlock, KH, of Southwell, Nottinghamshire, in 1844. They had no children, and he was succeeded by his brother. He was High Sheriff of Nottinghamshire for 1867.
Sir Richard Sutton, 4th Baronet (1821–1878). Sutton served with the Life Guards. He married firstly Anna Houson (died 8 July 1846), daughter of the Reverend H. Houson, of Brant Broughton, in 1845. He married secondly Harriet Anne Burton in 1851. They had several children.
Sir Richard Francis Sutton, 5th Baronet (20 December 1853 – 25 February 1891). Sutton was the owner of the racing yacht Genesta with which he raced Puritan for the America's Cup in 1885. He was married to Constance Corbet, daughter of Sir Vincent Corbet, Bt. He was succeeded by his son. He was Sheriff of Berkshire in 1887.
Sir Richard Vincent Sutton, 6th Baronet (26 April 1891 – 29 November 1918). Sutton fought as a lieutenant in the First World War and was wounded in action in October 1914. He was one of the richest men in England, owning  and part of the West End in London. His engagement was announced in 1916. He was succeeded by his uncle.
Sir Arthur Edwin Sutton, 7th Baronet (1857–1948). Son of the 4th Baronet. Sutton bought Shanks in 1920, and held it as his seat until his death. Sir Arthur was married to Cecil Blanche Dumbleton (died 1948), daughter of Walter Douglas Dumbleton. He was succeeded by his son.
Sir Robert Lexington Sutton, 8th Baronet (1897–1981). He was succeeded by his son.
Sir Richard Lexington Sutton, 9th Baronet (1937–2021). He was murdered at his Dorset home on 7 April 2021. His net worth was estimated at £301 million in 2020.

Currently, the Baronetcy is vacant until David Robert Sutton proves his entitlement to it.

Sutton baronets, of Moulsey (1806)
Sir Thomas Sutton, 1st Baronet (1755–1813), Member of Parliament who resided at Molesey in Surrey.

Sutton baronets, of Castle House (1919)
Sir George Augustus Sutton, 1st Baronet (1869–1947)

Sutton baronets, of Beckenham (1922)
Sir George Sutton, 1st Baronet, of Beckenham (1856–1934), Chairman of W. T. Henley's Telegraph Works Company (1918–1932).

Notes

References
 
Kidd, Charles, Williamson, David (editors). Debrett's Peerage and Baronetage (1990 edition). New York: St Martin's Press, 1990.

Obituary: Sir Richard Sutton, Bart., for the death of the second baronet. The Gentleman's Magazine January 1856, pp. 80–82. Retrieved 13 February 2008.
Jinman, Richard. "A cup of tea but tight lips in historic landowner's fiefdom" #  The Guardian, Wednesday 23 March2005
Jones, George William. Richard Vincent Sutton : a record of his life together with extracts from his private papers.  London : Printed by G.W. Jones at the Sign of the Dolphin, 1922.
Sutton baronets genealogy
Burton genealogy

Baronetcies in the Baronetage of Great Britain
Extinct baronetcies in the Baronetage of the United Kingdom